Michael Person (born ) is an American politician who served as a member of the Missouri House of Representatives from the 74th district. Elected in November 2019, he assumed office in January 2020. After winning a full term in November 2020, redistricting of 2022 placed his home in district 73, with fellow incumbent Raychel Proudie, and Person lost the next primary to Proudie. As such, his tenure in the House ended in January 2023.

Education 
Person earned a Bachelor of Science degree in mechanical engineering from the Missouri University of Science and Technology in 1978, known then as the University of Missouri–Rolla.

Career 
Person was a member of the Riverview Gardens School Board from 2004 to 2007. He has worked as a torchlighter for United Way and a diversity and inclusion facilitator for Ameren. He also served as a member of the Ferguson Township Democratic Committee. After his state representative resigned, Person was selected as a candidate by a Democratic committee and was elected to the Missouri House of Representatives in a November 2019 special election, assuming office on January 8, 2020. Two House Democrats expressed concern that Person's nomination meeting was held at his own home. In response, Person said another location was too small and he had hosted party functions previously.

Electoral history

References 

Democratic Party members of the Missouri House of Representatives
Living people
Missouri University of Science and Technology alumni
Politicians from St. Louis County, Missouri
United Ways people
Year of birth missing (living people)